Hernán Agustín Lamberti (born 3 May 1984) is an Argentine professional footballer who plays as a midfielder for Quilmes.

Career
Lamberti's senior career got underway in 2003 with Almagro in Primera B Nacional, with the midfielder featuring twenty-five times throughout the 2003–04 campaign which Almagro ended with promotion to the Primera División. After twenty-one matches as the club were relegated, Lamberti left in 2005 to join Guaraní of the Paraguayan Primera División. One goal in sixteen fixtures followed. Lamberti returned to Argentina with All Boys in 2006, before going to Juventud Antoniana soon after. Ecuadorian Serie A side Olmedo signed Lamberti in 2007. They placed third in his sole season, making thirty-six appearances and netting once.

2008 saw Lamberti rejoin Juventud Antoniana, which preceded a stint in Brazilian football with Flamengo. Sportivo Desamparados became Lamberti's seventh unique career club in 2009. He remained with the Argentine third tier club for two seasons. After they won promotion from the 2010–11 Torneo Argentino A, he scored seven goals in thirty-seven encounters in Primera B Nacional. Lamberti moved across the division to Aldosivi on 2 July 2012. He made his bow in August against Huracán, with his opening goal coming in 2013 versus Almirante Brown. Lamberti had five campaigns with Aldosivi, two in tier one.

Following a 2016–17 spell in Primera B Nacional with Central Córdoba, as they suffered relegation, Lamberti agreed terms with Primera B Metropolitana's Platense in August 2017. Thirty-three matches for the Florida Este team occurred in his debut season, which culminated with promotion to the second tier after defeating Estudiantes in a championship play-off.

Career statistics
.

Honours
Platense
 Primera B Metropolitana: 2017–18

References

External links

1984 births
Living people
People from Morón Partido
Argentine people of Italian descent
Argentine footballers
Association football midfielders
Argentine expatriate footballers
Expatriate footballers in Paraguay
Expatriate footballers in Ecuador
Expatriate footballers in Brazil
Argentine expatriate sportspeople in Paraguay
Argentine expatriate sportspeople in Ecuador
Argentine expatriate sportspeople in Brazil
Primera Nacional players
Argentine Primera División players
Paraguayan Primera División players
Primera B Metropolitana players
Torneo Argentino A players
Ecuadorian Serie A players
Club Almagro players
Club Guaraní players
All Boys footballers
Juventud Antoniana footballers
C.D. Olmedo footballers
Associação Atlética Flamengo players
Sportivo Desamparados footballers
Aldosivi footballers
Central Córdoba de Santiago del Estero footballers
Club Atlético Platense footballers
Quilmes Atlético Club footballers
Sportspeople from Buenos Aires Province